John Kirkbride (born 17 February 1946, Ullapool, Scotland) is a Scottish singer, guitarist, songwriter and entertainer, currently residing in Germany.

Style 
Kirkbride's musical style is deeply rooted in the 1920s and 30s inspired by such musicians as Blind Blake, Willie McTell and Robert Johnson. Later guitarists such as Doc Watson, Chet Atkins and Leon Redbone were also an influence. Slide and alternative tunings play a huge role in providing accompaniment to the many many songs he has composed over the years, that is not including of course the many jazz and blues standards played in his own style. His songs are not all recognisable as standard blues. Many of the songs, for example his song Gas Tax Blues, are of a social and critical nature more reminiscent of Bob Dylan or Randy Newman. His voice that has been compared to a "thousand litres of whisky".

History
John Kirkbride has been touring the world with his music since 1975 and has witnessed many changes in musical fashion, but has himself remained true to the older traditions of acoustic guitar and vocals.

Remaining true to his musical direction, and therefore not commercial in outlook, he is nevertheless respected enough to have been invited to play at the 1984 Montreux Jazz Festival. Also John has shared the stage with Joan Armatrading, John Mayall, even Golden Earring and Whitesnake. He has performed as a duo with Pete Seeger, Arlo Guthrie, Alexis Korner, Lightning Hopkins, Bert Jansch, Chuck Leavell and Louisiana Red and a notable session with Hank Marvin in the mid-1970s.

Today
, John Kirkbride is still touring, composing and recording. He is also teaching guitar to a new generation of young musicians who are increasingly fascinated by the guitar techniques of yesteryear, where a single guitar, picked fully, could sound like a one-man band.

Discography

LPs 
 Tracks
 Magnetic Mugshots of Memorable Moments
 Sourdough, Corn and Hot Biscuits
 Reds and Blues

CDs 
 Blue Images
 Street Kids	 
 Brotherhood in Blues (with Ferdl Eichner)	 
 Adam und Eva (with Hans-Christian Kirsch)	 
 Der Keltische Zauberspiegel (with Hans-Christian Kirsch)	 
 Riches to Rags (with Ferdl Eichner)	 
 Changing of the Ways (from Bluesballaden from Hans-Christian Kirsch)
 Return Cargo (with Albie Donnelly)	
 Sketches Out of the Box
 Lifeline (with Ferdl Eichner) 2009
 The Gambler (with Andreas Schirneck) 2013

References

External links
 
 
 John Kirkbride on FolkClub.de

Scottish male guitarists
Living people
1946 births
Slide guitarists
British blues guitarists